= Rensford, West Virginia =

- Unincorporated community
- Location within West Virginia and the United States Rensford (the United States)
- Coordinates: 38°18′50″N 81°28′51″W
- Country: United States
- State: West Virginia
- County: Kanawha
- Elevation: 771 ft (235 m)
- Time zone: UTC-5 (Eastern (EST))
  - Summer (DST): UTC-4 (EDT)
- GNIS ID: 1555464

Rensford is an unincorporated community in Kanawha County, West Virginia, United States. Its post office is closed. It was also known as Point Lick.

The community most likely was named after the Rensord family.
